The Treaty of Rhandeia was a peace treaty concluded between the Roman Empire and the Parthian Empire at the frontier town of Rhandeia in what is now Turkey in 63. The treaty, which finalized the Roman–Parthian War of 58–63, stipulated that henceforth a Parthian prince of the Arsacid line would sit on the Armenian throne, but his nomination, or right of investiture, was given to the emperor of Rome. Even though this made Armenia a client kingdom, various contemporary Roman sources thought that Nero had de facto ceded Armenia to the Parthian Empire. This compromise between Parthia and Rome lasted for several decades, until 114, when Rome under Trajan took direct control of Arsacid Armenia and incorporated it into a short-lived Roman province that lasted for a mere four years; it was outwardly relinquished under Trajan's successor Hadrian in 118.

The Arsacid dynasty would nevertheless maintain the Armenian throne, albeit most often as client kings, until 428, when the kingdom was partitioned by the Byzantines and Sasanians, and the eastern part of Armenia became a Sasanian province from then on ruled by a marzban.

References

Sources
 
 
 
 
 
 
 
 

1st-century treaties
60s in the Roman Empire
1st century in Iran
1st century in Armenia
Treaties of ancient Rome
Treaties of the Parthian Empire
Roman–Parthian Wars
Nero
Treaties of the Roman Empire
63